Elmer Pato (died July 16, 2020) was a Filipino taekwondo practitioner and sports executive who represented the Philippines in international competitions.

Background
Pato is a recognized pioneer of the Philippine Taekwondo Association, having served as chairman for the national sports association's regional affairs. Pato competed at the 1976 Asian Championships in Melbourne, Australia where he clinched a bronze medal. He also served as an instructor and coach when Taekwondo was in its infancy in the country.

Personal life
Pato is survived by his wife Maria Janela Pato, seven daughters and three sons. He was an architect by profession. Pato died due to COVID-19, amidst the COVID-19 pandemic, in July 16, 2020, at the age of 66.

Honors
1976 Asian Taekwondo Championships (+80kg; Bronze)

Reference

 

Filipino martial artists
Filipino male taekwondo practitioners
Visayan people
Asian Taekwondo Championships medalists
2020 deaths
Filipino architects
Deaths from the COVID-19 pandemic in the Philippines